Marthinus Johannes Mentz (born 21 July 1982 in Ermelo, South Africa) is a former South African rugby union player and currently the backline coach of Currie Cup side the . He regularly played as a winger or a fullback.

Career

He also represented South Africa at Under-16, Under-18 and Under-21 level and represented the South African Sevens in 18 tournaments between 2006 and 2011, including the 2010 Commonwealth Games in India where his team won the bronze medal.

He wrapped up his playing career at the Pumas, retiring after the 2012 season. The Pumas appointed him as a coach and assistant to head coach Jimmy Stonehouse. When Stonehouse left to join Japanese Top League side Toshiba Brave Lupus at the start of 2015, Mentz was named as his successor. He guided the Pumas to their first ever Vodacom Cup title in 2015, beating  24–7 in the final, and to sixth position in the 2015 Currie Cup Premier Division.

On 2 November 2015, the Pumas announced that Mentz was reappointed as head coach until the end of 2017.

References

South African rugby union players
Living people
1982 births
People from Ermelo, Mpumalanga
Rugby union fly-halves
Rugby union wings
Rugby union fullbacks
Griquas (rugby union) players
Leopards (rugby union) players
Pumas (Currie Cup) players
South African rugby union coaches
Commonwealth Games medallists in rugby sevens
Rugby sevens players at the 2010 Commonwealth Games
Commonwealth Games rugby sevens players of South Africa
Commonwealth Games bronze medallists for South Africa
Medallists at the 2010 Commonwealth Games